Dust in the Wind is a 1986 film by Taiwanese filmmaker Hou Hsiao-hsien. It is based on co-screenwriter Wu Nien-jen's own experiences, and is the first part of a trilogy of collaborations with Wu, the others being A City of Sadness (1989) and The Puppetmaster (1993).

Synopsis
A love story about a young couple from a village in the northern-east part of Taiwan in the early 1980s. The boy, Wan, goes to Taipei to work after graduating from junior high school so he can earn money to send home. The girl, Huen, follows him the next year and they work hard to earn enough money to marry. Then Wan must spend three years in the Republic of China Army and the girl marries someone else. Although Wan regrets what happened he does not blame Huen.

Cast
 Wang Chien-wen as Wan (謝文遠 Xiè Wényuǎn)
 Xin Shufen as Huen (江素雲 Jiāng Sùyún)
 Li Tian-lu as Wan's grandfather
 Lawrence Ko as Mrs. Lin's son

Production
The film features Li Tian-lu in the role of the grandfather. Li became a central part of Hou's major films.

External links 
 

1980s Mandarin-language films
1986 films
1986 drama films
Films directed by Hou Hsiao-hsien
Films with screenplays by Wu Nien-jen
Central Motion Picture Corporation films
Films with screenplays by Chu T’ien-wen
Taiwanese drama films